Ansi Nika (born 22 August 1990) is an Albanian professional footballer who plays as a midfielder for Albanian club Flamurtari Vlorë.

Club career
Nika begun his professional career with Ada Velipojë where he played for two seasons, before joining his boyhood club Vllaznia Shkodër at the start of 2009–10 season.

Nika signed a new one year contract with Teuta Durrës on 19 June 2014.

A day later, he was loaned out to Kukësi for their UEFA Europa League qualification games. However, this deal later turned to be a permanent deal, as Nika remained at the club for the entire 2015–16 season.

On 5 July 2016, Nika joined Tirana on a two-year contract. He was presented three days later along with fellow midfielder Afrim Taku. He scored his first goal for the club on 26 October in the 4–1 away win against Luftëtari Gjirokastër, valid for the first leg of Albanian Cup's second round. Nika terminated his contract by mutual consent on 7 January due to lack playing of time, having collect only 338 minutes in league during the first part of the season. In an interview one day later, Nika cited that he left the club on his free will.

On 10 January 2017, Nika agreed personal terms and signed a contract until the end of the season with Albanian Superliga strugglers Laçi. With the number 14, Nika made his competitive debut with the club on 28 January by playing full-90 minutes in a 0–1 vital win over Korabi Peshkopi. He netted his maiden Laçi goal on 18 March, the winner against Flamurtari Vlorë at Laçi Stadium as the team took three vital points in their bid to escape relegation. Nika finished the season by making 15 league appearances, including 2 in cup, as Laçi avoided the relegation by just one point by winning in the last matchday against Teuta Durrës.

After initially announcing his departure from the club in the start of July, Nika returned to the club in the first days of August ahead of the new season. In the 2017–18 season, Nika continued to be a consistent starter in the midfield as he finished it with 30 league games and 2 goals. On 27 May 2018, he played in the 2018 Albanian Cup Final match versus Skënderbeu Korçë which ended in defeat. He left the club in June 2018, concluding his spell with the club by playing 51 matches between league and cup.

On 4 July 2018, Nika left Albania for the first time to sign with Football Superleague of Kosovo side Gjilani.

On 18 August 2019, Nika was announced as the newest player of Flamurtari Vlorë, returning in Albanian Superliga after one season.

Personal life
His younger brother is also a footballer who currently plays for Ada Velipojë. Nika is a fan of his hometown club Vllaznia, whom he played in 2009–10 season.

Career statistics

Honours
Kukësi

Albanian Cup: 2015–16

References

External links
FSHF profile

1990 births
Living people
Footballers from Shkodër
Albanian footballers
Association football midfielders
KS Ada Velipojë players
KF Vllaznia Shkodër players
KF Teuta Durrës players
FK Kukësi players
KF Tirana players
KF Laçi players
SC Gjilani players
Flamurtari Vlorë players
Kategoria e Parë players
Kategoria Superiore players
Football Superleague of Kosovo players
Albanian expatriate footballers
Expatriate footballers in Kosovo
Albanian expatriate sportspeople in Kosovo